is a 2016 Japanese romance film directed by , starring Takanori Iwata and Mitsuki Takahata and based on the romance novel  by Hiro Arikawa. It was released in Japan on June 4, 2016.

Plot
Sayaka (Mitsuki Takahata) works at an office. She's not very good at her job or with love. One night, she finds a man, Itsuki (Takanori Iwata), collapsed in front of her home. She takes him inside and they begin to live together. Itsuki teaches Sayaka about cooking wild herbs and collecting wild herbs, but he has a secret.

Cast
Takanori Iwata as Itsuki
Mitsuki Takahata as Sayaka

Reception

References

External links
 

2016 films
Japanese romance films
Films based on romance novels
2016 romance films
Films based on Japanese novels
2010s Japanese films

ja:植物図鑑 (小説)#映画